Kulushevo (Qoloş) is a rural locality (a village) in Urazovsky Selsoviet, Uchalinsky District, Bashkortostan, Russia. The population was 151 as of 2010. There are 6 streets.

Geography 
Kulushevo is located 37 km southwest of Uchaly (the district's administrative centre) by road. Kutuyevo is the nearest rural locality.

References 

Rural localities in Uchalinsky District